Orotava is a genus of tephritid  or fruit flies in the family Tephritidae.

Species
Orotava cribrata (Bigot, 1891)
Orotava hamula (Meijere, 1914)

References

Tephritinae
Tephritidae genera
Diptera of Asia
Diptera of Europe